The 1991–92 NBA season was the 22nd season of the National Basketball Association in Cleveland, Ohio. During the off-season, the Cavaliers signed free agent John Battle, then later on re-signed former Cavs forward Mike Sanders in March after being released by the Indiana Pacers. After two straight seasons of injuries, the Cavaliers would finally play the entire season without any significant loss of manpower. After a 13–9 start to the season, the team posted an 11-game winning streak, and held a 31–14 record at the All-Star break. The Cavaliers finished the season 2nd in the Central Division with a 57–25 record, and tying the franchise high set in the 1988–89 season. On December 17, 1991, the Cavaliers set an NBA record by winning with the second largest margin of victory of any game defeating the Miami Heat at home, 148–80 (68 points).

Brad Daugherty led the team with 21.5 points and 10.4 rebounds per game, while Mark Price averaged 17.3 points and 7.4 assists per game, and Larry Nance averaged 17.0 points, 8.3 rebounds and 3.0 blocks per game. In addition, Craig Ehlo contributed 12.3 points per game, and sixth man Hot Rod Williams provided the team with 11.9 points, 7.6 rebounds and 2.3 blocks per game off the bench. Daugherty and Price were both named to the All-NBA Third Team, 
and selected for the 1992 NBA All-Star Game, while Price finished in seventh place in Most Valuable Player voting, Nance was named to the NBA All-Defensive Second Team, and top draft pick Terrell Brandon made the NBA All-Rookie Second Team.

In the Eastern Conference First Round of the playoffs, the Cavaliers defeated the New Jersey Nets in four games. In the Eastern Conference Semi-finals, they trailed 2–1 to the 2nd-seeded Boston Celtics, but managed to win in a full seven game series. In the Eastern Conference Finals, they faced against Michael Jordan, Scottie Pippen and the defending champion Chicago Bulls, where they tied the series at one game a piece, with a 26-point road win in Game 2, 107–81. However, the Bulls would defeat the Cavaliers in four games to two. The Bulls would defeat the Portland Trail Blazers in six games in the NBA Finals, winning their second consecutive championship.

Draft picks

*2nd round pick acquired from New York via Charlotte in Randolph Keys deal.
 2nd round pick (#38) traded to Los Angeles Clippers in Danny Ferry deal. Used to draft Joe Wylie.
 2nd round pick (#51) traded to New Jersey in Chris Dudley deal, then to Boston and Houston. Used to draft Žan Tabak.

Roster

Regular season

Season standings

y – clinched division title
x – clinched playoff spot

z – clinched division title
y – clinched division title
x – clinched playoff spot

Record vs. opponents

Game log

|-style="background:#fcc;"
| 1 || November 1, 1991 || @ Portland
| L 106–117
|
|
|
| Memorial Coliseum
| 0–1
|-style="background:#fcc;"
| 2 || November 2, 1991 || @ L.A. Clippers
|-style="background:#cfc;"
| 3 || November 5, 1991 || @ Dallas
|-style="background:#fcc;"
| 4 || November 7, 1991 || @ Houston
|-style="background:#fcc;"
| 5 || November 8, 1991 || @ San Antonio
|-style="background:#cfc;"
| 6 || November 12, 1991 || Milwaukee
|-style="background:#cfc;"
| 7 || November 14, 1991 || Seattle
|-style="background:#cfc;"
| 8 || November 16, 1991 || Indiana
|-style="background:#fcc;"
| 9 || November 20, 1991 || @ Charlotte
|-style="background:#cfc;"
| 10 || November 21, 1991 || New Jersey
|-style="background:#cfc;"
| 11 || November 23, 1991 || Detroit
|-style="background:#cfc;"
| 12 || November 26, 1991 || @ Philadelphia
|-style="background:#cfc;"
| 13 || November 27, 1991 || Philadelphia
|-style="background:#cfc;"
| 14 || November 29, 1991 || Orlando

|-style="background:#fcc;"
| 15 || December 4, 1991 || @ Chicago
| L 102–108
|
|
|
| Chicago Stadium
| 9–6
|-style="background:#cfc;"
| 16 || December 5, 1991 || @ Detroit
|-style="background:#cfc;"
| 17 || December 7, 1991 || Washington
|-style="background:#fcc;"
| 18 || December 11, 1991 || @ Miami
|-style="background:#cfc;"
| 19 || December 12, 19917:30 pm EST || Atlanta
| W 134–107
| Nance (26)
| Daugherty (15)
| Brandon,Price (7)
| Richfield Coliseum11,429
| 12–7
|-style="background:#fcc;"
| 20 || December 14, 1991 || Dallas
|-style="background:#cfc;"
| 21 || December 17, 1991 || Miami
|-style="background:#fcc;"
| 22 || December 18, 1991 || @ New Jersey
|-style="background:#cfc;"
| 23 || December 20, 19917:30 pm EST || @ Atlanta
| W 122–99
| Brandon (19)
| Daugherty (10)
| Brandon,Daugherty (7)
| The Omni10,384
| 14–9
|-style="background:#cfc;"
| 24 || December 21, 1991 || Charlotte
|-style="background:#cfc;"
| 25 || December 23, 1991 || Utah
|-style="background:#cfc;"
| 26 || December 26, 1991 || @ Milwaukee
|-style="background:#cfc;"
| 27 || December 27, 1991 || San Antonio
|-style="background:#cfc;"
| 28 || December 30, 1991 || Houston

|-style="background:#cfc;"
| 29 || January 2, 1992 || @ New York
|-style="background:#cfc;"
| 30 || January 3, 1992 || @ Boston
|-style="background:#cfc;"
| 31 || January 7, 1992 || @ Minnesota
|-style="background:#cfc;"
| 32 || January 9, 1992 || @ Washington
|-style="background:#cfc;"
| 33 || January 11, 1992 || Philadelphia
|-style="background:#fcc;"
| 34 || January 14, 1992 || Portland
| L 114–121
|
|
|
| Richfield Coliseum
| 24–10
|-style="background:#fcc;"
| 35 || January 16, 1992 || Chicago
| L 85–100
|
|
|
| Richfield Coliseum
| 24–11
|-style="background:#cfc;"
| 36 || January 18, 1992 || New York
|-style="background:#fcc;"
| 37 || January 20, 1992 || Boston
|-style="background:#cfc;"
| 38 || January 22, 1992 || Indiana
|-style="background:#cfc;"
| 39 || January 24, 1992 || @ Indiana
|-style="background:#fcc;"
| 40 || January 25, 1992 || @ Orlando
|-style="background:#cfc;"
| 41 || January 29, 1992 || @ Detroit
|-style="background:#cfc;"
| 42 || January 30, 1992 || Orlando

|-style="background:#cfc;"
| 43 || February 2, 1992 || Minnesota
|-style="background:#cfc;"
| 44 || February 5, 1992 || @ Philadelphia
|-style="background:#fcc;"
| 45 || February 6, 1992 || Detroit
|- align="center"
|colspan="9" bgcolor="#bbcaff"|All-Star Break
|-style="background:#fcc;"
| 46 || February 11, 1992 || @ Utah
|-style="background:#fcc;"
| 47 || February 12, 1992 || @ Denver
|-style="background:#cfc;"
| 48 || February 15, 1992 || New Jersey
|-style="background:#cfc;"
| 49 || February 17, 1992 || @ Chicago
| W 113–112
|
|
|
| Chicago Stadium
| 33–16
|-style="background:#fcc;"
| 50 || February 18, 1992 || @ Milwaukee
|-style="background:#cfc;"
| 51 || February 20, 1992 || @ New York
|-style="background:#cfc;"
| 52 || February 21, 1992 || Sacramento
|-style="background:#cfc;"
| 53 || February 23, 1992 || Milwaukee
|-style="background:#fcc;"
| 54 || February 26, 1992 || @ Phoenix
|-style="background:#cfc;"
| 55 || February 28, 1992 || @ L.A. Lakers

|-style="background:#fcc;"
| 56 || March 1, 1992 || @ Seattle
|-style="background:#cfc;"
| 57 || March 4, 1992 || @ Sacramento
|-style="background:#fcc;"
| 58 || March 5, 1992 || @ Golden State
|-style="background:#cfc;"
| 59 || March 7, 19927:30 pm EST || @ Atlanta
| W 110–94
| Nance (35)
| Nance (12)
| Price (8)
| The Omni13,950
| 44–21
|-style="background:#cfc;"
| 60 || March 10, 1992 || Phoenix
|-style="background:#cfc;"
| 61 || March 13, 1992 || L.A. Lakers
|-style="background:#cfc;"
| 62 || March 15, 1992 || Denver
|-style="background:#cfc;"
| 63 || March 16, 1992 || @ Washington
|-style="background:#fcc;"
| 64 || March 18, 1992 || @ Boston
|-style="background:#cfc;"
| 65 || March 20, 1992 || Golden State
|-style="background:#cfc;"
| 66 || March 22, 199212 Noon EST || Atlanta
| W 123–80
| Daugherty (22)
| Ferry (16)
| Brandon (13)
| Richfield Coliseum15,406
| 45–21
|-style="background:#cfc;"
| 67 || March 24, 1992 || Indiana
|-style="background:#cfc;"
| 68 || March 25, 1992 || @ Orlando
|-style="background:#cfc;"
| 69 || March 27, 1992 || @ Charlotte
|-style="background:#fcc;"
| 70 || March 28, 1992 || @ Chicago
| L 102–126
|
|
|
| Chicago Stadium
| 48–22
|-style="background:#cfc;"
| 71 || March 31, 1992 || Miami

|-style="background:#cfc;"
| 72 || April 2, 1992 || L.A. Clippers
|-style="background:#cfc;"
| 73 || April 3, 1992 || @ Miami
|-style="background:#cfc;"
| 74 || April 5, 1992 || New York
|-style="background:#fcc;"
| 75 || April 7, 1992 || Boston
|-style="background:#cfc;"
| 76 || April 9, 1992 || Charlotte
|-style="background:#fcc;"
| 77 || April 10, 1992 || @ New Jersey
|-style="background:#cfc;"
| 78 || April 12, 1992 || Washington
|-style="background:#cfc;"
| 79 || April 14, 1992 || Chicago
| W 115–100
|
|
|
| Richfield Coliseum
| 55–24
|-style="background:#fcc;"
| 80 || April 15, 1992 || @ Charlotte
|-style="background:#cfc;"
| 81 || April 17, 1992 || @ Indiana
|-style="background:#cfc;"
| 82 || April 19, 19927:30 pm EDT || Atlanta
| W 112–108
| Price (22)
| Nance (12)
| Price (6)
| Richfield Coliseum17,296
| 57–25
|-

Playoffs

|- align="center" bgcolor="#ccffcc"
| 1
| April 23
| New Jersey
| W 120–113
| Brad Daugherty (40)
| Brad Daugherty (16)
| Mark Price (10)
| Richfield Coliseum16,512
| 1–0
|- align="center" bgcolor="#ccffcc"
| 2
| April 25
| New Jersey
| W 118–96
| Brad Daugherty (29)
| Hot Rod Williams (9)
| Mark Price (15)
| Richfield Coliseum20,273
| 2–0
|- align="center" bgcolor="#ffcccc"
| 3
| April 28
| @ New Jersey
| L 104–109
| Larry Nance (28)
| Larry Nance (14)
| Mark Price (12)
| Brendan Byrne Arena15,258
| 2–1
|- align="center" bgcolor="#ccffcc"
| 4
| April 30
| @ New Jersey
| W 98–89
| Hot Rod Williams (20)
| Brad Daugherty (14)
| Craig Ehlo (7)
| Brendan Byrne Arena13,071
| 3–1
|-

|- align="center" bgcolor="#ccffcc"
| 1 || May 2 || Boston
| W 101–76
| Brad Daugherty (26)
| Brad Daugherty (17)
| Mark Price (7)
| Richfield Coliseum17,496
| 1–0
|- align="center" bgcolor="#ffcccc"
| 2 || May 4 || Boston
| L 98–104
| Brad Daugherty (22)
| three players tied (9)
| Mark Price (8)
| Richfield Coliseum20,273
| 1–1
|- align="center" bgcolor="#ffcccc"
| 3 || May 8 || @ Boston
| L 107–110
| Mark Price (27)
| Larry Nance (12)
| Mark Price (10)
| Boston Garden14,890
| 1–2
|- align="center" bgcolor="#ccffcc"
| 4 || May 10 || @ Boston
| W 114–112 (OT)
| Larry Nance (32)
| Craig Ehlo (9)
| Mark Price (12)
| Boston Garden14,890
| 2–2
|- align="center" bgcolor="#ccffcc"
| 5 || May 13 || Boston
| W 114–98
| Brad Daugherty (28)
| Brad Daugherty (9)
| Craig Ehlo (13)
| Richfield Coliseum20,273
| 3–2
|- align="center" bgcolor="#ffcccc"
| 6 || May 15 || @ Boston
| L 91–122
| Hot Rod Williams (18)
| Hot Rod Williams (11)
| Mark Price (5)
| Boston Garden14,890
| 3–3
|- align="center" bgcolor="#ccffcc"
| 7 || May 17 || Boston
| W 122–104
| Brad Daugherty (28)
| Nance, Daugherty (9)
| Nance, Price (8)
| Richfield Coliseum20,273
| 4–3
|-

|- align="center" bgcolor="#ffcccc"
| 1
| May 19
| @ Chicago
| L 89–103
| Brad Daugherty (23)
| Larry Nance (12)
| Mark Price (9)
| Chicago Stadium18,676
| 0–1
|- align="center" bgcolor="#ccffcc"
| 2
| May 21
| @ Chicago
| W 107–81
| Brad Daugherty (28)
| Brad Daugherty (9)
| Ehlo, Price (7)
| Chicago Stadium18,676
| 1–1
|- align="center" bgcolor="#ffcccc"
| 3
| May 23
| Chicago
| L 96–105
| Craig Ehlo (20)
| Brad Daugherty (10)
| Daugherty, Ehlo (5)
| Richfield Coliseum20,273
| 1–2
|- align="center" bgcolor="#ccffcc"
| 4
| May 25
| Chicago
| W 99–85
| Larry Nance (22)
| Brad Daugherty (14)
| Brad Daugherty (6)
| Richfield Coliseum20,273
| 2–2
|- align="center" bgcolor="#ffcccc"
| 5
| May 27
| @ Chicago
| L 89–112
| Mark Price (24)
| Hot Rod Williams (11)
| Ehlo, Price (3)
| Chicago Stadium18,676
| 2–3
|- align="center" bgcolor="#ffcccc"
| 6
| May 29
| Chicago
| L 94–99
| Larry Nance (25)
| Larry Nance (16)
| Mark Price (8)
| Richfield Coliseum20,273
| 2–4
|-

Player statistics

Season

Playoffs

Awards and records 
 Wayne Embry, NBA Executive of the Year Award
 Mark Price, All-NBA Third Team
 Brad Daugherty, All-NBA Third Team
 Larry Nance, NBA All-Defensive Second Team
 Terrell Brandon, NBA All-Rookie Team 2nd Team

Transactions

References

 Cleveland Cavaliers on Database Basketball

Cleveland Cavaliers seasons
Cleve
Cleve